Elias Villarael Zarate was a 22-year-old, Mexican immigrant who was lynched in Weslaco, Hidalgo County, Texas by a white mob, his body then being discovered on November 11, 1922. The lynching of Zarate (also known as the Weslaco Affair) was the 15th lynching in Texas. According to the United States Senate Committee on the Judiciary it was the 56th of 61 lynchings during 1922 in the United States.

Background
 
Texas was a very hostile place towards Mexicans after World War I. According to Lawrence A. Cardoso right after World War I ended, one Mexican national was lynched a week in the state of Texas. 

On Thursday, November 9, 1922, Elias V. Zarate was part of a crew erecting a creamery at Weslaco. A fight broke out after a co-worker, J.L. Sullivan, got Zarate fired when Sullivan complained about the quality of his work. In the fight, Sullivan's arm was broken and Zarate was arrested by Weslaco police.   Zarate was placed into an unguarded building that was sometimes used as a jail.

Lynching
At 8:00 PM, Thursday, November 9, 1922, a mob of 8-15 people were able to break the lock to the temporary jail and forced Zarate at gunpoint into a car.  It was hours before the absence was noticed by police. He was never seen alive again and Zarate's body was found on a road  from Weslaco on November 11, 1922.

Aftermath

After the lynching, anti-minority sentiment in some Texas cities and towns peaked with large white mobs roaming the streets demanding Blacks and Mexicans leave their areas. On November 16, 1922, hundreds of whites marched through the streets of Breckenridge, Texas.  Mexican Consul General Eduardo Ruiz complained to Governor Pat Morris Neff about the lynching and anti-Mexican protests. When this got no response he lodged a complaint with Secretary of State Charles Evans Hughes. Hughes then ordered Governor Neff to act and the Governor rushed extra police to Weslaco who improved the conditions for Mexicans living in the region.

Annotations

References 
Notes

Bibliography 

 - Total pages: 144 
 - Total pages: 23

 - Total pages: 448 

1922 riots
1922 in Texas
African-American history of Texas
Lynching deaths in Texas
February 1922 events
Protest-related deaths
Racially motivated violence against African Americans
Riots and civil disorder in Texas
White American riots in the United States